The fossil springsnail, scientific name Pyrgulopsis simplex, is a species of minute freshwater spring snails, aquatic gastropod mollusks or micromollusks in the family Hydrobiidae. This species is endemic to the United States.

References 

Endemic fauna of the United States
Pyrgulopsis
Gastropods described in 1988
Taxonomy articles created by Polbot